Puerto Rico Highway 823 (PR-823) is a rural road between the municipalities of Dorado and Toa Alta in Puerto Rico.

Major intersections

See also

 List of highways numbered 823

References

External links
 

823